Marcela Joglová (born 27 July 1987) is a Czech athlete. She competed in the women's marathon event at the 2019 World Athletics Championships. In 2020, she competed in the women's race at the 2020 World Athletics Half Marathon Championships held in Gdynia, Poland.

References

External links
 

1987 births
Living people
Czech female long-distance runners
Czech female marathon runners
Place of birth missing (living people)
World Athletics Championships athletes for the Czech Republic
Athletes (track and field) at the 2020 Summer Olympics
Olympic athletes of the Czech Republic
20th-century Czech women
21st-century Czech women